The coat of arms of Darwin were granted by Queen Elizabeth II on 9 December 1959—the same year that Darwin gained city status.

See also
Australian heraldry

References
Darwin City Council Coat of Arms

Darwin
Darwin, Northern Territory
Darwin
Darwin
Symbols introduced in 1959